In mathematics, Matsumoto zeta functions are a type of zeta function introduced by Kohji Matsumoto in 1990. They are functions of the form

where p is a prime and Ap is a polynomial.

References

Zeta and L-functions